María del Rosario Sánchez Guerrero (born October 26, 1973 in Ciudad de México, Distrito Federal) is a female track and field athlete from Mexico, who competed in race walking.

Career
She represented her native country at the 2004 Summer Olympics in Athens, Greece.

Achievements

References

 Profile
 
 Picture of Rosario Sánchez

Notes

1973 births
Living people
Mexican female racewalkers
Athletes (track and field) at the 1999 Pan American Games
Athletes (track and field) at the 2003 Pan American Games
Athletes (track and field) at the 2004 Summer Olympics
Olympic athletes of Mexico
Athletes from Mexico City
Pan American Games medalists in athletics (track and field)
Pan American Games silver medalists for Mexico
Central American and Caribbean Games silver medalists for Mexico
Central American and Caribbean Games bronze medalists for Mexico
Competitors at the 1998 Central American and Caribbean Games
Competitors at the 2002 Central American and Caribbean Games
Competitors at the 2010 Central American and Caribbean Games
Central American and Caribbean Games medalists in athletics
Medalists at the 1999 Pan American Games
Medalists at the 2003 Pan American Games